The  2018–19 season was the 57th season of competitive football by Dunărea Călărași, and their first ever in Liga I. Dunărea Călărași competed in the Liga I and in Cupa României.

Previous season positions

Players

Transfers

In

Loans in

Out

Loans out

Competitions

Liga I

The Liga I fixture list was announced on 5 July 2018.

Regular season

Table

Results summary

Results by round

Matches

Relegation round

Table

Results summary

Position by round

Matches

Cupa României

See also

 2018–19 Cupa României
 2018–19 Liga I

References

FC Dunărea Călărași seasons
Dunărea, Călărași, FC